Ho Chi Minh City University of Foreign Languages and Information Technology (abbreviation: HUFLIT) is a university located at 828 Su Van Hanh, District 10, Ho Chi Minh City, Vietnam. Date of foundation: October 26, 1994, according to Decision No. 616/Ttg by the Prime Minister of the Socialist Republic of Vietnam. HUFLIT is the first private university in Ho Chi Minh City and South Vietnam on the basis of former Saigon Foreign Languages and Information Technology School which was established in 1992.

HUFLIT is a tertiary education institution (basing on the credit system) directly supervised and managed by the Ministry of Education and Training.

HUFLIT's greatest objective is to educate and train intellectuals to gain a tertiary education, having knowledge related to a specialized field as well as to good practical and professional skills that meet the needs of the market economy. The academic curriculum of HUFLIT is suitable for Vietnamese requirements and comparable to the curriculum of advanced universities in the world.

Faculties
 Faculty of Foreign Languages (English and Chinese)
 Faculty of Information Technology
 Faculty of Oriental Languages and Cultures (Japanese; Korean, Chinese)
 Department  of International Business Administration
 Faculty of Tourism and Hospitality
 Faculty of International Relations
 Faculty of Accounting - Finance
 Faculty of Second Degree (English, Chinese, BA)
 Faculty of Political Reasoning
Faculty of Lă

External links
Official Website of HUFLIT

Universities in Ho Chi Minh City